Denys Halata (born 4 September 2000) is a Ukrainian football forward who plays for Kremin Kremenchuk on loan from Vorskla Poltava.

Career
Halata is a product of Kremin Kremenchuk youth sportive system. He continued his youth career in the Vorskla Poltava.

In 2019 he was promoted to the main squad to play in the Ukrainian Premier League for Vorskla. Halata made his debut in the Ukrainian Premier League for FC Vorskla as a substituted on 15 December 2019, playing in a winning match against FC Karpaty Lviv.

References

External links
 
 

2000 births
Living people
People from Kremenchuk
Ukrainian footballers
Association football forwards
FC Vorskla Poltava players
FC Kremin Kremenchuk players
Ukrainian Premier League players
Sportspeople from Poltava Oblast